Aranmanai 3 is an 2021 Indian Tamil-language comedy horror film written directed by Sundar C. The film stars an ensemble star cast including Sundar C, Arya, Raashii Khanna and Andrea Jeremiah, with Sakshi Agarwal, Vivek marking the first posthumous release, Myna Nandhini, Yogi Babu, Nalini, Manobala, Sampath Raj, Baby Ovi Bhandarkar, Vincent Asokan, Madhusudhan Rao and Vela Ramamoorthy in prominent roles. It is the third instalment in the Aranmanai film series, produced by Khushbu under the banner of Avni Cinemax, with cinematography by U. K. Senthil Kumar, music composed by C. Sathya, and film editing by Fenny Oliver. The story revolves Jyothi (Raashii Khanna), who is threatened by a vengeful spirit, as she tries to discover the truth with her relative Ravi (Sundar C.).

The film was announced in January 2020 and shoots were scheduled to begin in February. Production and release were delayed due to the COVID-19 pandemic.

Aranmanai 3 was theatrically released on 14 October 2021, coinciding with Ayudha Puja, The film marks the posthumous release of late actor Vivek. The film received mixed to negative reviews from critics and audience with criticism aimed generic action sequences, outdated plot, the ensemble cast, villain and the lead actor's screen space, but Raashii Khanna's performance and the score received praise. Despite the negative reviews, the film was declared as a commercial success at the box office, and became the one of highest grossing and most profitable Tamil films of 2021.

Plot 
The film begins with a young Jyothi encounters a spirit in her home, terrifying her. Her father, Zamindar Rajasekhar, resents Jyothi as her mother died giving birth to her. Believing that she is lying for attention, he angrily sends her off to a boarding school.

Many years later, a court ruling forces Rajasekhar to open a secret room at the village temple. Rajasekhar is terrified and angry at the ruling, and is shocked when nothing is found inside the room. Soon after, Rajasekhar's manservant and driver, Durai, commits suicide. Jyothi, now an adult, returns for Durai's funeral, and falls in love with her childhood sweetheart, Saravannan.

Jyothi realizes that the spirit that haunted her is now haunting her young relative Shalu. Jyothi is later lured to her late mother's room and nearly killed by a falling chandelier, but is saved by a portrait of her late mother, Eeshwari. She later has another encounter with both Eeshwari's spirit and the spirit haunting Shalu. One night, Shalu argues with the hostile spirit and is doused in paint thinner. She is chased by flames and rescued by her father, Ravi. Jyothi convinces Ravi to investigate the mysterious occurrences for Shalu's sake.

Ravi investigates Eeshwari's room and discovers a photo of Jyothi's parents with three servants, with the faces of two servants scratched out. He encounters Eeshwari's spirit and the third servant in the photo is killed shortly after. Ravi and Jyothi bring priests to exorcise the palace. They trap one of the two ghosts, but the other appears and destroys the trap, revealing that it has possessed Saravanan. Ravi tells Jyothi that this spirit is Eeshwari, who was responsible for the murders and the attack on Jyothi.

Rajasekhar is spooked by the deaths and visits Saamiyaadi, a hermit priest. Saravanan attacks the pair. Ravi manages to rescue Rajasekhar, but Saamiyaadi is left behind and is confronted by Eeshwari. Rajasekhar reveals the truth to Ravi. He had forcibly married Eeshwari after falling for her at her wedding to Saamiyaadi's son, Samikannu. When their child is born, the child resembles Samikannu, and Rajasekhar realizes that she had already been pregnant at the wedding. A furious Rajasekhar has the child secretly killed and buried in the palace, then kills Eeshwari. He replaces the dead child with Durai's newborn daughter and claims her as his own.

Samikannu steals Eeshwari's body and attempts to use black magic to revive her, but is horrified when she returns as a ghoul and abandons her in the forest. Eeshwari later kills the midwife who poisoned her child and threatens Rajasekhar. Rajasekhar convinces Saamiyaadi to help him destroy the spirit his son revived. Saamiyaadi tricks Samikannu into luring out Eeshwari's spirit and traps her in the hidden room in the temple. During the attempt, Saamiyaadi accidentally kills Samikannu and withdraws to the forest to mourn.

In the present, Eeshwari reveals that it was Durai who had killed Samikannu on Rajasekhar's order. She wants to replace the soul in Jyothi's body with that of her dead child, believing that Jyothi is living the life that her child should have had. She convinces Saamiyaadi to raise the spirit of Samikannu to help her. Ravi and Jyothi trap and take the spirit of Eeshwari's child to the priests who had helped them. They initially try to lay her and Eeshwari to rest, but they are blindsided by the arrival of Samikannu. Rajasekhar is killed, but Jyothi, Ravi, and the priests manage to banish the three spirits during a holy festival, freeing Saravanan.

Saravanan and Jyothi marry. A sequel is hinted.

Cast

Production

Development 
After the release of Action (2019), In January 2020, sources claimed that director Sundar C. will make his third installment for the Aranmanai film series to following the success of two films Aranmanai (2014) and Aranmanai 2 (2016), and same month it was reported that Sun Pictures is set to produce the film. Later, Sundar announced that the film will be produced by Avni Cinemax and Khushbu within their own production house. He started the casting work for the film in early January 2020.

Casting 

Arya and Raashii Khanna confirmed in February 2020 that they had signed the film. The film marks the first collaboration between Arya and Khanna. A source revealed that Khanna's role would have a huge importance in the film. Khanna allotted 30 days to shoot Aranmanai 3, and a remuneration of ₹1.5 crore was offered to her. The source claimed that Arya would be playing the role of a man possessed by a spirit. Sundar C initially planned to have Hansika Motwani to play the second female lead. However, due to scheduling problems, she didn't sign with the film. Instead, in the same month, Andrea Jeremiah, who had also appeared in the first installment of Aranmanai film series, signed on as the second female lead. At the time, Sakshi Agarwal, of Bigg Boss 3 fame, was also in talks for to play an important role, which was later finalised. Later, Yogi Babu, Vivek, Manobala, and several others joined the film. Shankar Mahadevan and Hariharan made cameos in the film. Andrea Jeremiah later reported that she was playing the role of a ghosts, and that the story revolves around her character.

Filming 

The filming started at the Gujarat wankaner palace in February 2020. In March 2020, shooting was postponed due to the COVID-19 pandemic, and scheduled to resume in November 2020 in Pollachi. It was rescheduled to begin on November 20, 2021. More than Rs. 2 crore had been spent to construct the set used for the climax sequence. In January 2021, shooting was completed. However, the film post-production was delayed as the director Sundar tested positive for COVID-19, and post production work began in February, ending early in March. The climax portions were filmed in 16 days, with 200 background workers, and computer graphics work was conducted for 6 months.

Music 

The film's soundtrack was composed by C. Sathya, who was collaborating for second time with Sundar C. after Theeya Velai Seiyyanum Kumaru (2013). Audio rights of the film were acquired by Saregama. The first single "Ratapatata", sung by Arivu, was released on August 30, 2021. The second single "Rasavaachiye", sung by Sid Sriram, was released on September 13, 2021. The third single "Lojakku Mojakku" was sung by Mukesh and released on September 22, 2021. The fourth single "Sengaandhale", sung by Reema, released on October 6, 2021. The fifth and final single, "Theeyaga Thondri", sung by Shankar Mahadevan and Hariharan, was released on 12 October 2021.

Marketing 
The first look and motion poster were released on 22 April 2021. Exclusive stills of the film were leaked online two months later, and went viral. The official trailer of the film was released on 30 September, landed in a huge response with two million views in one day, and became the highest trending video on YouTube.

A press meet for the film was held on 10 October 2021 in Chennai.

Release

Theatrical
The film release was initially planned for a theatrical release in summer of 2021. However, due to the second wave of COVID-19, the film release and post-production were postponed. It was then scheduled to release in September 2021,  and later pushed to October. The film was given a U/A certificate by the Censor Board with 3 cuts, due to scenes that contained "strong violence". The distribution rights for the film were acquired by Red Giant Movies. The film released on 14 October 2021 coinciding with Ayudha Puja.

Home media
Red Giant Movies withheld the satellite rights of this film, and sold it to their own channel Kalaignar TV. The digital rights of the film were sold to ZEE5, where it began streaming on 12 November 2021.

Reception

Critical response
Aranmanai 3 received mixed to negative reviews from the critics.

Indian Express gave 0.5 out of 5 stars and called it, "The dumbest film of the year yet". The News Minute gave the movie 1.5 stars and said, "No ghost, spirit or spectre doomed to haunt the same house for eternity has felt more trapped than I did in the theatre today. Even an end credit song by Arivu couldn’t keep me from fleeing for the exit the second the lights came on. Avoid Aranmanai 3 with the same dedication that Sundar C shows in evading at arriving at a conclusion in this film."

The Hindu said Sundar C's third installment in the ‘Aranmanai’ franchise succeeds neither in scaring the audience nor making them laugh. Time of India gave 3 stars to the film and said, "It all happens in predictable fashion, and by the time the film ends, we neither feel overwhelmed nor underwhelmed. That, in a way, is the director's success - making us feel contended [sic] with a passable and instantly forgettable entertainer." Dinamani said, "Overall it is doubtful whether even those who liked the first and second parts of Aranmanai will like this film.

Subha J Rao of Film Companion wrote, "What is the point of taking forward a franchise when there’s little to redeem it? It’s just a waste of everyone’s time."

Box office 
Despite receiving mixed to negative reviews, Aranmanai 3 had a good opening on the first day of its theatrical release and became a hit at the box-office, with the film collecting over Rs 15 crore in the first four days of its release.

Controversy 
There were complaints among critics and audience about the film's lead actor, Arya's, screen space in the film. The entire team promoted the movie with him, and conveyed that he had been playing a lead role as a spirit. However, his total screen space in the film was only 30 minutes. This "Extended Cameo" in the film was noted as a disappointment.

Sequel 
Sundar C also confirmed the fourth installment in Aranmanai film series titled Aranmanai 4, he revealed that this sequel will begin on 2023.

See also
 Aranmanai (film series)
 Muni (film series)
 Pizza (film series)

References

External links 
 

2021 films
2020s Tamil-language films
Indian comedy horror films
Films directed by Sundar C.
Films scored by C. Sathya
2021 comedy horror films